Landscape Ontario Horticultural Trades Association, or simply Landscape Ontario, is an association representing the horticultural industry in Ontario. It serves 10 related sectors of horticulture and has more than 2,000 member companies

It was founded in 1973 by combining three separate horticultural associations into one: Ontario Garden Maintenance and Landscape Association, Ontario Landscape Contractors Association, and Ontario Nurseryman's Association.

Organization
The association is governed by an elected Provincial Board of Directors. The current president of the board is David Wright, owner of Wright Landscape Services in Bloomingdale Ontario.

Chapters
Landscape Ontario's membership is organized by a chapter system.

 Durham
 Georgian Lakelands
 Golden Horseshoe
 London
 Ottawa
 Toronto
 Upper Canada
 Waterloo
 Windsor

Exhibitions
Landscape Ontario started its January trade show Congress in 1973. In 2003, a secondary fall buying show was created called Garden Expo. Over the years this show has merged with other like minded shows like the National Hardware Show and continually partners up with Flowers Canada which changed the shows name to Garden and Floral Expo. To alleviate confusion, the show is now known as Landscape Ontario's Expo.

Landscape Ontario and the Garden Club of Toronto founded Canada Blooms in 1996 as a consumer show.

References

External links
 Landscape Ontario's Consumer Site
 Landscape Ontario's Trade Site
 Canada Blooms Garden Festival

Trade associations based in Ontario
Horticulture in Canada
Gardening in Canada